Baharen Phir Bhi Aayengi is a 1966 Hindi-language romantic-tragedy film produced by Guru Dutt and directed by Shaheed Latif. It stars Dharmendra, Mala Sinha, Tanuja, Deven Verma, Rehman, Johnny Walker in lead roles. The film is still remembered for its music by O. P. Nayyar and lyrics by Sheven Rizvi, Aziz Kashmiri and for its expressionistic cinematography by K.G. Prabhakar.

Plot
Jeetendra Gupta is a reporter working in a newspaper company in Calcutta, who lives with his elder widowed sister, his niece and his best-friend Chunnilal. Jeetendra exposes dangerous working conditions in a mine owned by one of his employer's crooked creditors and consequently loses his job. Jeeten is out looking for another job when he comes across Sunita, who was about to commit suicide by jumping from the same train that night after a prank played by Vikram Verma. Jeeten prevents her from jumping and they take shelter in a hut nearby. They leave for their respective homes the next day after Sunita mistakenly thinks Jeeten's name was actually Chunnilal. When disaster strikes at the mine (as predicted by Jeeten), Amita, managing director of the newspaper and daughter of the paper's deceased founder realised her mistake and re-employs him as the editor of the newspaper. However, her interest in him is more than just journalism as she gradually starts developing feelings towards him.

Meanwhile, Sunita has also started developing feelings for Jeeten (who she thinks is Chunnilal) and writes him a letter asking him to meet her. Jeeten finally meets Sunita and reciprocates Sunita's feelings for him. They keep dating for some time. On one weekend, Jeeten came to Sunita's house only to realise that Amita was Sunita's elder sister.

Shortly afterwards, the Indo-China war takes place and Jeeten decides to travel to Tezpur to report about the Indian Army's bravery in holding off the Chinese forces there. Amita goes to find Jeeten only to see him and Sunita together in each other's arms. She becomes heartbroken but still wants her sister to be happy with Jeeten. Meanwhile, Jeeten finds a damaged bridge which broke within a year of its construction. He learns that the same people who financed the mine were behind this and gathers evidence to publish. The creditors are enraged and want Jeeten to be removed from the company. Mr. Verma, elder brother of Vikram, reveals to Jeeten that Amita owed lots of money to the same creditors and Jeeten, in order to save Amita, leaves his job. Amita becomes desperate to bring him back and when confronted by Mr. Verma, she reveals that she is in love with Jeeten. Sunita overhears this and is devastated. She leaves the house to marry Vikram in order to make her sister be with Jeeten. She even lies to Jeeten to make it easier for him to move on from her.

Amita gradually starts losing her mind to the point she became completely insane. She learns that Sunita knew about her love for Jeeten and that Sunita left to leave Jeeten for her. This makes her go completely crazy as she tried to stop Sunita from marrying Vikram, who she didn't approve of. She locks herself in her father's old office while speaking to herself. While at Vikram's house, Sunita finds a photo of Amita in Mr. Verma's room which made her realise that he was in love with Amita all this time. Meanwhile, the corrupt creditors along with the board of directors were on the verge of usurping the company from Amita. Jeeten, Sunita and Mr. Verma are searching for Amita but are too late as they found her laying on the floor after she suffered a heart attack. In her dying moments, she confessed to Jeeten that she loves him and that her father's old office was not leased to the creditors and it would serve as the foundation for their new company. She dies in Jeeten's arms after uttering "Baharen Phir Bhi Aayengi".

Cast
 Dharmendra as Jeetendra Gupta "Jeeten"
 Mala Sinha as Amita
 Tanuja as Sunita "Babli"
 Deven Verma as Vikram Verma
 Rehman as Mr. Verma
 Johnny Walker as Chunnilal
 Mumtaz Begum as Jeeten's elder sister
 Badri Prasad as Mr. Shukla

Production
The movie started with Guru Dutt in the main lead. He was replaced by Dharmendra and the movie re-shot due to Dutt's death; it turned out to be Guru Dutt team's last offering.
 Art direction: Souren Sen 
 Costume design: Bhanu Athaiya

Soundtrack
The music is by O. P. Nayyar, and the lyrics are by S. H. Bihari, Anjaan, Shevan Rizvi, Aziz Kashmiri and Kaifi Azmi.

References

External links
 

1960s Hindi-language films
1966 films
Films with screenplays by Abrar Alvi
Films set in Kolkata
Indian romantic drama films
Films scored by O. P. Nayyar